Alyssum wulfenianum, the madwort (a name it shares with some of the other members of its genus), is a species of flowering plant in the family Brassicaceae, native to the southeastern Alps. Preferring dry, porous soils, it is hardy in USDA zones 4 through 9. There is a cultivar, 'Golden Spring'.

Subtaxa
The following subspecies are accepted:
Alyssum wulfenianum subsp. ovirense  – southeastern Alps
Alyssum wulfenianum subsp. wulfenianum – southeastern Alps

References

wulfenianum
Garden plants of Europe
Flora of Italy
Flora of Austria
Flora of Yugoslavia
Plants described in 1814